The Football (Disorder) Act 2000 is an Act of the Parliament of the United Kingdom enacted during the premiership of Tony Blair. It served as an amendment to the Football Spectators Act 1989, and strengthened football banning orders (FBOs), a civil order imposed to those convicted of football-related offences. FBOs may be issued by courts in the United Kingdom, or following a complaint from a local police force.

The Act was "rushed through Parliament" by then-Home Secretary Jack Straw following violent clashes during UEFA Euro 2000. It allows police in England and Wales to arrest those suspected of travelling abroad to participate in hooliganism at international games, and to withhold their passports up to five days before an international fixture. Straw stated during an opposition day for his Bill that he was keen to enact the new laws in time for England's next international game against France in September 2000.

FBOs, introduced by Football Spectators Act 1989, may ban an individual from football grounds in the United Kingdom for two to ten years, with provisions for individual cases. Supporters may also be barred from using public transport on matchdays, and from town centres and built-up, high-risk areas prior to and following matches.

The Act has been criticised by civil liberties campaigners for being "draconian", fearing it may result in profiling based on fan appearance.

More than 450 supporters were prevented from travelling to Greece for a World Cup qualifier in 2001 under the Act.

References

External links 
 Text of the Football (Disorder) Act 2000 as in force today (including any amendments) within the United Kingdom, from legislation.gov.uk

History of football in England
United Kingdom Acts of Parliament 2000
Association football law
2000–01 in English football